Dej Marij (also Romanized as Dej Marīj and Dej Merīj; also known as Dech Merīch and Dezh Mārīj) is a village in Qilab Rural District, Alvar-e Garmsiri District, Andimeshk County, Khuzestan Province, Iran. At the 2006 census, its population was 35, in 5 families.

References 

Populated places in Andimeshk County